Andrew Mitchell is an Australian rules football umpire currently officiating in the Australian Football League.

He joined the Victorian Football League in 2004, umpiring in the 2009 and '11 Grand Finals. He was appointed to the AFL list in 2012 and made his debut in Round 1 of that year, in a match between the Western Bulldogs and West Coast.

References

Living people
Australian Football League umpires
Year of birth missing (living people)